Mandya Assembly seat is one of the seats in Karnataka Legislative Assembly in India. It is a segment of Mandya Lok Sabha seat.

Members of Assembly 
 1962 : J. Devaiah (IND)
 2013 : M. H. Ambareesh (Congress) 
 2018 : M Srinivasa  (JD-S)

Election results

1962 Assembly Election
 J. Devaiah (IND) : 23,299 votes    
 K. V. Shankara Gowda (INC) : 22,639 votes

2013 Assembly Election
 M H Ambareesh (Congress) : 90,329 votes  
 M Srinivasa (JD-S) : 47,392 votes
 T L Ravishankar (BJP) : 3,094

2018 Assembly Election
 M Srinivas (JD-S) : 69,421 votes  
 P Ravikumar (Congress) : 47,813  
 N Shivanna (BJP) : 32,064

See also 
 Mandya District
 List of constituencies of Karnataka Legislative Assembly

References 

Assembly constituencies of Karnataka
Mandya district